The Chattanooga Locomotion was a team in the Independent Women's Football League based in Chattanooga, Tennessee.  The Home games of the team were played on the campus of Red Bank High School.

From their inception in 2001 until 2008, the Locomotion played in the National Women's Football Association.

Season-by-season 

|-
| colspan="6" align="center" | Chattanooga Locomotion (NWFA)
|-
|2001 || 1 || 7 || 0 || 5th Southern || --
|-
|2002 || 4 || 4 || 0 || 3rd Central || --
|-
|2003 || 11 || 1 || 0 || 1st Southern Central|| Lost Southern Conference Semifinal (Oklahoma City)
|-
|2004 || 6 || 2 || 0 || 1st Southern South || Lost Southern Conference Semifinal (Pensacola)
|-
|2005 || 8 || 3 || 0 || 4th Southern || Won Southern Conference Quarterfinal (Dallas)Lost Southern Conference Semifinal (Pensacola)
|-
|2006 || 6 || 3 || 0 || 2nd Southern Southeast || Won League Wild Card (Austin)Lost League Quarterfinal (D.C.)
|-
|2007 || 8 || 1 || 0 || 1st Southern Central || Lost Southern Conference Semifinal (Columbus)
|-
|2008 || 5 || 3 || 0 || 2nd Southern East || --
|-
| colspan="6" align="center" | Chattanooga Locomotion (IWFL)
|-
|2009 || 6 || 3 || 0 || 6th IWFL2 || Lost IWFL2 Quarterfinal (Wisconsin)
|-
|2010 || 4 || 4 || 0 || 2nd IWFL2 Eastern Southeast || Lost IWFL2 Quarterfinal (Carolina Phoenix)
|-
|2011 || 8 || 3 || 0 || 2nd Eastern Mid South || Won Founders Bowl Tournament Quarterfinal (North Texas)Lost Founders Bowl Tournament Semifinal (New England)
|-
|2013 || 1 || 6 || 0 || 4th Eastern Southeast || --
|-
|2014 || 0 || 7 || 0 || 4th Eastern South Atlantic || --
|-
!Totals || 68 || 47 || 0
|colspan="2"| (including playoffs)

Season schedules

2009

2010

2011

Players Honored 
Schandra "Sunshine" Loveless, Loco #43, played on the inaugural United States national women's football team in 2010.  The US team won the gold medal at the IFAF Women's World Championship while not allowing any opponents to score against them.

2011 IWFL All-Stars:  Coach - Steve Lewis; Alternates - #5 Amanda Cunningham, #66 Starlisa Horton, #24 Denisha Montgomery, #14 Tiffany Newcomb, #54 Crystal Vaughan

Former players 
On September 1, 2006, Kristin Reese, a player for the Chattanooga Locomotion was killed in a motorcycle accident. The loss of one of their own has greatly shook them, but they  promised to play harder than they ever played before, in her memory. Before the first game of the 2007 Season, the Locomotion also lost Jeff Ellis, an important member of the team performing many managerial functions.

References

 Chattanooga Locomotion official website
 IWFL official website

Independent Women's Football League
American football in Chattanooga, Tennessee
American football teams in Tennessee
American football teams established in 2001
American football teams disestablished in 2014
Women's sports in Tennessee
2001 establishments in Tennessee
2014 disestablishments in Tennessee